Matsubayashi-Ryū (松林流), is a style of Okinawan karate founded in 1947 by Shōshin Nagamine (1907–1997) (an Okina Sensei). Its curriculum includes 18 kata, seven two-man yakusoku kumite (pre-arranged sparring) routines, and kobudō (weapons) practice.

Nagamine named his style in honor of the two most important masters that his teachings were based upon: Sōkon Matsumura of Shuri-te, and Kosaku Matsumora of Tomari-te. He chose to name the school using the first kanji characters from both master's names Matsu (松) and the style is pronounced in Japanese "Matsubayashi". Matsubayashi-ryū is a style of Shōrin-ryū and the terms Matsubayashi-ryū and Shōrin-ryū can be used interchangeably. Normally, the style is referred to as Shōrin-ryū, but when a definite distinction is required between the other styles of the Shōrin-ryū family (Kobayashi Shōrin-ryū, Shōbayashi Shōrin-ryū and Matsumura Seito Hohan Sōken) then it is called Matsubayashi-ryū. Nagamine also credited Motobu Chōki as the teacher who inspired his seven Yakusoku Kumite Forms.

Matsubayashi-ryū is one of the better-documented traditional karate styles, owing to Nagamine's book, The Essence of Okinawan Karate-dō. as well as Tales of Okinawa's Great Masters. Takayoshi Nagamine

After the death of Nagamine O Sensei in 1997, many of his senior students formed their own organisations to teach Matsubayashi-ryū. In the years following Nagamine Soke, continued to lead the organization, but was unable to get unification, due to politics within the organization.   Since 2012, Yoshitaka Taira has been the association president. There are now, many other organizations which are continuing the teachings of O Sensei outside of the WMKA.

Kata 

Kata are sets of moves in Karate and are considered the most important part of the Matsubayashi-ryu style.

 Fukyugata series (1-2)
 Pinan series (1-5)
 Naihanchi series (1-3)
 Ananku
 Wankan
 Rōhai
 Wanshu
 Passai
 Gojūshiho
 Chintō
 Kusanku

Ranks 
These are the ranks as set out by the World Matsubayashi-ryu (Shorin-ryu) Karate-Do Association (WMKA) and the Kodokan Nagamine Karate Dojo (World Honbu).

Mudansha
 8th Kyu - White Belt, one green stripe
 7th Kyu - White Belt, two green stripes
 6th Kyu - Green Belt, three white stripes
 5th Kyu - Green Belt, two white stripes
 4th Kyu - Green Belt, one white stripe
 3rd Kyu - Brown Belt, three white stripes
 2nd Kyu - Brown Belt, two white stripes
 1st Kyu - Brown Belt, one white stripe

Yudansha
 1st to 10th Dan - Black Belt

Shogo Titles
 Renshi (6th Dan) - Black Belt with one stripe
 Kyoshi (7th & 8th Dan) - Black Belt with two stripes
 Hanshi (9th & 10th Dan) - Black Belt with three stripes
 Hanshisei (10th Dan) - Black Belt with four stripes

Major Organizations of Matsubayashi-ryu 

After the passing of the Matsubayashi-ryu founder, Shoshin Nagamine, in 1997 many practitioners of Matsubayashi-ryu Karate-do were affiliated with the Nagamine Honbu Dojo and the Okinawan Matsubayashi-ryu Karate-do Federation.

World Matsubayashi-ryu Karate-Do Association (WMKA), headed by Yoshitaka Taira  and Toshimitsu Arakaki
 Matsubayashi Associations or Honbu dojos throughout the World ***
 SKKA North American Matsubayashi Shorin Ryu Karate & Kobudo Association, Gardena California. Eihachi Ota Hanshi, 10 Dan. http://www.shorin-ryu.com/
NAMKA North American Matsubayashi Ryu Karate Association - Don Caponigro Sensei
 http://matsubayashi-ryu.org/ European Matsubayashi-ryu (Shorin-ryu) Karate-Do Association (EMKA)], Europe - Ole-Bjørn Tuftedal
 Okinawa Shorin-ryu New Zealand, New Zealand - Kevin Plaisted
 Matsubayashi-ryu Karate Association of Australia (MKAA), Australia - John Carlyle                                                                         
 Okinawan Shorin Ryu Karate - Midwest-honbu-dojo (USA) - Bill George sensei
 Website - https://okinawan-shorin-ryu-karate---midwest-honbu-dojo-54.webself.net/ 
 World Shorin-ryu Karate-Do Federation (WSKF), United States - Board of Directors
 Matsubayashi Shorin-ryu International, Ireland - Patrick Beaumont Sensei
 Matsubayashi-Ryu (Shorin-ryu) Karate-Do Argentina, Argentina, headed by Shigehide Akamine Hanshi Matsubayashi-ryu (Shorin-Ryu) Karate-Do Argentina
 Shorin Ryu Karate-Do International headed by Tamaki Takeshi Sensei
 SKKA Canada - www.shorin-ryu.ca

Well-known Matsubayashi-Ryu Practitioners 
Ranks and honorifics have been excluded from the list for simplicity.

Okinawa
Shoshin Nagamine, Founder of Matsubayashi-Ryu, O-sensei  (DECEASED) 1907 - 1997
Takayoshi Nagamine, Second generation headmaster (Soke) of Matsubayashi-Ryu. USA in 1967 to teach in Cincinnati Ohio until 1979. (DECEASED) 
Nakamura Seigi, Senior student of Shoshin Nagamine, and Chief Instructor at the Honbu dojo (DECEASED)
Masao Shima, Senior student of Shoshin Nagamine (DECEASED)
Yasuharu Makishi, Senior student of Shoshin Nagamine (DECEASED)
Toshimitsu Arakaki, Senior student of Shoshin Nagamine
Yoshitaka Taira, student of Shoshin Nagamine
Kiyoshi Shinjo, Senior student of Shoshin Nagamine
Eihachi Ota, Student of O-sensei Nagamine & Senior student of Masao Shima.
Takeshi Tamaki, Senior student of Shoshin Nagamine  
Nobuhide Higa, Senior student of Shoshin Nagamine 
Chotoku Omine, Senior student of Shoshin Nagamine and sent to the United States to promote Matsubayashi-Ryu by Shoshin Nagamine (DECEASED)
Kensei Taba (DECEASED), Senior student of Shoshin Nagamine and Founder of his own organisation, the Okinawa Shogen-Ryu Karate-Do Assn.
Chokei Kishaba, Senior student of Shoshin Nagamine and Founder of Shōrin-ryū Kishaba Juk
Shigehide Akamine, Student of Shoshin Nagamine who moved to Argentina and heads the Matsubayashi-Ryu (Shorin-Ryu) Karate-Do Argentina

United States
 *Eihachi Ota Hanshi 10 Dan, student of Masao Shima. Highest ranked Matsubayashi practitioner in the US, over 75 years old, he is still very active. He is President of SKKA (Shorin Ryu Karate Kobudo Association) & Okinawa Karate and Kobudo Association.
James Wax, First non-Okinawan to receive a Black belt from Shoshin Nagamine in Matsubayashi-Ryu.(DECEASED) 
Sam Palmer, Student of Ueshiro Sensei (DECEASED)
Parker Shelton, Student of Bob Yarnall and James Wax (DECEASED)
Joseph Carbonara - Student of Chotoku Omine (DECEASED)
Bob Yarnall, Student of Jim Wax
James Driggs, Student of Jim Wax & Takayoshi Nagamine - All (DECEASED)
Frank Grant (deceased) Student of Jim Wax and Shoshin Nagamine, Chairman of the World Shorin-ryu Karate-do Federation
Bill George, Student of Soke Takayoshi Nagamine 
Walter Rowden,(Deceased)  Student of Sam Palmer,(Deceased)
David Erler, Student and son of Ed Erler
Ed Erler, Student of Omine Chotoku sensei
Evan Cosden, Student of Ed Erler & Eihachi Ota
Richard Lohrding, Student of Sam Palmer
Don Caponigro, Student of Frank Grant/Soke Nagamine

Canada
Frank Baehr - Student of Shoshin Nagamine

 Ireland 
 Patrick Beaumont - Student of Nagamine Takayoshi Soke

Spain
Ricardo Fuchs Camani - Student of Shigehide Akamine

Norway
Ole-Bjørn Tuftedal - Student of Yoshitaka Taira Sensei

References

Sources
Shoshin Nagamine. The Essence of Okinawan Karate-do.  chapter 1 pages 21–24
Classical Kata of Okinawan Karate  Chapter 1 page 18
Okinawan Karate: Teachers, Styles and Secret Techniques. .page 12
https://www.amazon.com/dp/1653464062 "A Simple Man" Takayoshi Nagamine

External links
Okinawan Shorin Ryu Karate Website 
The Directory of Okinawa Karate and kobudo

Shōrin-ryū